Lavaedeay Monlique "Vad" Lee (born April 27, 1993) is an American football quarterback for the Philadelphia Stars of the United States Football League (USFL). He went to Hillside High School (Durham, North Carolina). Lee is considered to be a skilled dual-threat, athletic quarterback who redshirted as a true freshman at Georgia Tech. Lee played in several games during his redshirt freshman season in 2012 as a backup to starting Georgia Tech quarterback Tevin Washington, and Lee was the Yellow Jackets' starting quarterback during 2013 season. Lee went to Georgia Tech after a successful prep career in North Carolina. In January 2014, Lee transferred to James Madison University.

High school
Lee earned four varsity letters and served three years as a team captain while playing for Hillside under coach Antonio King. Lee led Hillside to the North Carolina state championship in 2010. Lee's high school career totals include: 5,000 passing yards, 1,960 rushing yards, and Lee was responsible for 85 touchdowns. Lee also played wide receiver as a sophomore, producing 1,124 receiving yards and nine touchdowns.

Lee led Hillside to a perfect 16–0 record in 2010 and won the North Carolina 4A State Championship game 40–0 over Davie County at BB&T field in Winston-Salem, North Carolina. Lee threw for 264 yards and three touchdown passes in the state championship game, earning MVP honors. Lee's other high school honors include: the Pac-6 Conference Player of the Year, the AP North Carolina state Player of the Year, first team all-state, and MVP of the Offense-Defense All-American Bowl.

College

Georgia Tech
Lee was recruited by Georgia Tech as a four-star recruit. He received a redshirt season in 2011. Lee played in several games during 2012 football season as a backup to starting Georgia Tech quarterback Tevin Washington. However, Lee saw only limited playing time until Georgia Tech faced North Carolina on November 10, 2012. Lee entered the game at Kenan Memorial Stadium with Tech trailing North Carolina 14–7 in the first quarter, and he never left. Lee made Georgia Tech's triple option offense unstoppable, helping the Yellow Jackets account for 588 yards of offense in a 68–50 win over North Carolina, the most combined points ever in any Atlantic Coast Conference football game. Lee rushed for 112 yards and two touchdowns, and he threw for 169 yards and a touchdown as well. However, coach Paul Johnson continued to start Washington in every football game during 2012 season, and he rotated the two quarterbacks with their playing time depending on performance during games. Lee became the Yellow Jackets' starting quarterback at the beginning of the 2013 football season. Lee announced his decision to transfer to another school at the end of the 2013 football season.

James Madison
In January 2014, Chip Patterson at CBSsports.com reported Lee would transfer to FCS James Madison for the upcoming spring semester. Lee transferred to JMU due to his familiarity with the Dukes' new head coach, Everett Withers, who had recruited him from his time at North Carolina.

2014 season
In his first season with the Dukes, Lee was named the starter at quarterback and would go on to lead the Dukes to a 9–3 regular season along with a trip to the 2014 FCS playoffs. Along the way, Lee would go on to set JMU's single-game passing, completion percentage, single-season touchdown, passing & total-offense records in addition to being named CAA Offensive Player of the Week three times. Following a 55–20 JMU victory over rival Richmond on November 15, 2014, Lee was named to the 2014 Walter Payton Award watch list and would ultimately place 4th for that award. On December 10, 2014, Vad Lee was named the recipient of  the 2014 Dudley Award, which is given to the top Division I football player in Virginia over Old Dominion's Taylor Heinicke & Virginia Tech's Kendall Fuller. The following week, Lee was named 2014 Associated Press Third Team FCS All-American.

2015 season
Prior to the start of the 2015 season, Lee was named to the watch lists for the STATS FCS Offensive Player of the Year (formerly the Walter Payton Award) and the College Football Performance Awards FCS National Performer of the Year Trophy. In JMU's 2015 home opening victory against Morehead State, Lee became the first JMU QB to throw for more than 250 yards and rush for more than 100 in a single game. In a week four 48-45 victory against SMU, Lee set a Division I record by becoming the first player to both run and pass for 275 yards in a single game.

After a 7-0 start to the season, Lee suffered a broken foot during the fourth quarter of a 59-49 loss against Richmond. During the game, Lee tied JMU's all-time passing touchdown record with 51 career touchdowns, across just 21 games. Lee was forced to undergo surgery for his foot, ending his final college season. While announcing the end of Lee's career, head coach Everett Withers called him "one of the best players in JMU history."

Statistics

Source:

Professional career

Saskatchewan Roughriders
Lee played in three games for the Saskatchewan Roughriders in 2016, recording one rushing attempt.

Columbus Lions
On August 28, 2017, Lee signed with the Columbus Lions for the 2018 season. He was released on February 1, 2018.

Your Call Football
In February 2019, Lee joined Your Call Football where he was coached by Solomon Wilcots during a 4-game series where fans called the plays through a mobile app.

DC Defenders
Lee was signed by the DC Defenders of the XFL in December 2019. He was waived during final roster cuts on January 22, 2020.

TSL Alphas
Lee signed with the Alphas of The Spring League in May 2021.

Pittsburgh Maulers
He signed with the Pittsburgh Maulers of the United States Football League on May 10, 2022. Lee led the team to its first win of the season just 5 days later. He was released after the season on January 2, 2023.

BC Lions
Lee signed with the BC Lions of the CFL on January 5, 2023. He was released on February 27, 2023.

Philadelphia Stars
On March 19, 2023, Lee signed with the Philadelphia Stars of the United States Football League (USFL).

Career statistics

See also
 List of Georgia Tech Yellow Jackets starting quarterbacks
 Georgia Tech Yellow Jackets football statistical leaders
 2012 Sun Bowl

References

External links
 JMUsports.com Bio: Vad Lee
 YouTube video: Vad Lee interview with Wes Durham published on 11/15/12
 ESPN Profile

American football quarterbacks
Canadian football quarterbacks
American players of Canadian football
1993 births
Living people
Georgia Tech Yellow Jackets football players
James Madison Dukes football players
Columbus Lions players
Saskatchewan Roughriders players
Players of American football from North Carolina
People from Wilson, North Carolina
DC Defenders players
Hillside High School (Durham, North Carolina) alumni
The Spring League players
Pittsburgh Maulers (2022) players
BC Lions players
Philadelphia Stars (2022) players